The Samuel Bullock House, or the Dr Joshua DeVries House, is a historic cottage in Fremont, Nebraska. It was built in 1869, and designed in the Greek Revival architectural style. It was purchased by Arthur Truesdell in 1881; Truesdell was a businessman who served on the boards of directors of the Fremont Foundry and Machine Company and the Fremont National Bank. The cottage was acquired by Dr. Joshua DeVries, a physician and surgeon, in 1893. It has been listed on the National Register of Historic Places since September 12, 1985.

References

		
National Register of Historic Places in Dodge County, Nebraska
Greek Revival architecture in Nebraska
Houses completed in 1869